Lasse Olsen (born 18 November 1973) is a Norwegian former footballer who played as a forward for Gjelleråsen, Strømsgodset, Aalesund, and Mjøndalen.

He is the son of former Vålerenga player Terje Olsen.

After the 2008 season, his contract with Aalesund was not renewed. He initially contemplated retirement, but in late December he was signed by SK Herd together with former teammate Karl Oskar Fjørtoft. From 2012 he continued to play in the lower divisions of Møre og Romsdal.

Embarking on a manager career, he remained as junior and B team coach in SK Herd. He managed Averøykameratene in 2018 before moving on to Tomrefjord. He was hired in IL Valder on a two-year contract ahead of the 2021 season, but was fired after relegation from the 2021 4. divisjon.

References

1973 births
Living people
Association football forwards
Association football wingers
Norwegian footballers
Eliteserien players
Strømsgodset Toppfotball players
Aalesunds FK players
Mjøndalen IF players
Spjelkavik IL players
Norwegian football managers
Footballers from Oslo